Dilip Wedaarachchi (born 5 February 1957) is a Sri Lankan politician and a member of the Parliament of Sri Lanka. He is famous for having eaten raw fish at a press conference to shun the rumours claiming that Covid-19 virus can be transmitted by consumption of seafood. He gained further fame by demonstrating evidence of two thirds during a parliament session.

References

Living people
Members of the 11th Parliament of Sri Lanka
Members of the 12th Parliament of Sri Lanka
Members of the 13th Parliament of Sri Lanka
Members of the 14th Parliament of Sri Lanka
Members of the 15th Parliament of Sri Lanka
Members of the 16th Parliament of Sri Lanka
Samagi Jana Balawegaya politicians
United National Party politicians
1957 births
State ministers of Sri Lanka